The 2013 Topshelf Open was a tennis tournament played on outdoor grass courts. It was the 24th edition of the Rosmalen Grass Court Championships, and was part of the 250 Series of the 2013 ATP World Tour, and of the WTA International tournaments of the 2013 WTA Tour. Both the men's and the women's events took place at the Autotron park in Rosmalen, 's-Hertogenbosch, Netherlands, from June 16 through June 22, 2013.

ATP singles main-draw entrants

Seeds 

 1Seedings are based on the rankings as of June 10, 2013.

Other entrants 
The following players received wildcards into the main draw:
  Marius Copil
  Thiemo de Bakker
  Jesse Huta Galung

The following players received entry from the qualifying draw:
  Stéphane Bohli
  Jan Hernych
  Nicolas Mahut
  Lucas Pouille

The following player received entry as lucky loser:
  Steve Darcis

Withdrawals 
Before the tournament
  Alejandro Falla
  Marcel Granollers
  Jürgen Melzer
  Igor Sijsling (illness)
  Dmitry Tursunov

Retirements 
  Benoît Paire (thigh injury)

ATP doubles main-draw entrants

Seeds 

 Rankings are as of June 10, 2013.

Other entrants 
The following pairs received wildcards into the doubles main draw:
  Thiemo de Bakker /  Jesse Huta Galung
  David Goffin /  Dick Norman
The following pair received entry as alternates:
  Evgeny Donskoy /  Alex Kuznetsov

Withdrawals 
Before the tournament
  Igor Sijsling (illness)
During the tournament
  Benoît Paire (thigh injury)

WTA singles main-draw entrants

Seeds 

 1Seedings are based on the rankings as of June 10, 2013.

Other entrants 
The following players received wildcards into the main draw:
  Michaëlla Krajicek
  Arantxa Rus
  Daniela Hantuchová

The following players received entry from the qualifying draw:
  Andrea Hlaváčková
  An-Sophie Mestach
  Garbiñe Muguruza
  Yulia Putintseva

The following player received entry as lucky loser:
  Lesia Tsurenko

Withdrawals 
Before the tournament
  Romina Oprandi (right shoulder injury)

Retirements 
  Daniela Hantuchová (dizziness)
  Magdaléna Rybáriková (low back injury)

WTA doubles main-draw entrants

Seeds 

 1 Rankings are as of June 10, 2013.

Other entrants 
The following pairs received wildcards into the doubles main draw:
  Demi Schuurs /  Angelique van der Meet

Withdrawals 
During the tournament
  Daniela Hantuchová (dizziness)

Champions

Men's singles 

  Nicolas Mahut def.  Stanislas Wawrinka, 6–3, 6–4
 It was Mahut first title of the career.

Women's singles 

  Simona Halep def.  Kirsten Flipkens, 6–4, 6–2
 It was Halep's second title of the year and second of her career, a week after winning her first at Nürnberger Versicherungscup

Men's doubles 

  Max Mirnyi /  Horia Tecău def.  Andre Begemann /  Martin Emmrich, 6–3, 7–6(7–4)

Women's doubles 

  Irina-Camelia Begu /  Anabel Medina Garrigues def.  Dominika Cibulková /  Arantxa Parra Santonja, 4–6, 7–6(7–3), [11–9]

References

External links 
 

Topshelf Open
Topshelf Open
Topshelf Open
Rosmalen Grass Court Championships